A metropolitan area or metro is a region that consists of a densely populated urban agglomeration and its surrounding territories sharing industries, commercial areas, transport network, infrastructures and housing. A metro area usually comprises multiple principal cities, jurisdictions and municipalities: neighborhoods, townships, boroughs, cities, towns, exurbs, suburbs, counties, districts, as well as even states and nations like the eurodistricts. As social, economic and political institutions have changed, metropolitan areas have become key economic and political regions.

Metropolitan areas typically include satellite cities, towns and intervening rural areas that are socioeconomically tied to the principal cities or urban core, often measured by commuting patterns. Metropolitan areas are sometimes anchored by one central city such as the Paris metropolitan area (Paris) or Mumbai Metropolitan Region (Mumbai). In other cases metropolitan areas contain multiple centers of equal or close to equal importance especially in the United States, for example the Dallas–Fort Worth metropolitan area has 8 principal cities. The Islamabad–Rawalpindi metropolitan area (Islamabad and Rawalpindi), the Rhine-Ruhr in Germany and the Randstad in the Netherlands are other examples.

In the United States, the concept of metropolitan statistical areas has gained prominence. The area of the Greater Washington metropolitan area is an example of statistically grouping independent cities and county areas from various states to form a larger city because of proximity, history and recent urban convergence. Metropolitan areas may themselves be part of a greater megalopolis. For urban centres located outside metropolitan areas that generate a similar attraction at smaller scale for a region, the concept of a regiopolis and respectively regiopolitan area or regio was introduced by German professors in 2006. In the United States, the term micropolitan statistical area is used.

Definition
A metropolitan area combines an urban agglomeration, the contiguous, built-up area with zones not necessarily urban in character, but closely bound to the center by employment or other commerce. These outlying zones are sometimes known as a commuter belt, and may extend well beyond the urban zone, to other political entities. For example, Islip, New York on Long Island is considered part of the New York metropolitan area.

In practice, the parameters of metropolitan areas, in both official and unofficial usage, are not consistent. Sometimes they are little different from an urban area, and in other cases they cover broad regions that have little relation to a single urban settlement; comparative statistics for metropolitan area should take this into account. The term metropolitan can also refer to a county-level municipal government structure, with some shared services between a central city and its suburbs, which may or may not include the entirety of a metropolitan area. Population figures given for one metro area can vary by millions.

There has been no significant change in the basic concept of metropolitan areas since its adoption in 1950, although significant changes in geographic distributions have occurred since then, and more are expected. Because of the fluidity of the term "metropolitan statistical area," the term used colloquially is more often "metro service area," "metro area," or "MSA" taken to include not only a city, but also surrounding suburban, exurban and sometimes rural areas, all which it is presumed to influence. A polycentric metropolitan area contains multiple urban agglomerations not connected by continuous development. In defining a metropolitan area, it is sufficient that a city or cities form a nucleus with which other areas have a high degree of integration.

A metropolitan area is commonly known and characterized by a high concentration in service sector jobs and businesses.

Africa

South Africa
The Greater Johannesburg metropolitan area is the largest metropolitan area in South Africa. Its population was over 9.6 million as of the 2011 South Africa Census, in contrast to its urban area, which consisted of approximately 7.9 million inhabitants as of 2011. Conversely, metropolitan municipalities in South Africa are defined as commonly governed areas of a metropolitan area. The largest such metropolitan municipal government entity in South Africa is the City of Johannesburg Metropolitan Municipality, which presided over nearly 5 million people as of 2016. However, the Greater Johannesburg metropolitan area houses roughly ten times the population of its core municipal city of Johannesburg, which contained 957,441 people as of the 2011 census.

Americas

Brazil

The IBGE defines also "Immediate Geographic Areas" (formerly termed microregions) which capture the region "surrounding urban centers for the supply of immediate needs of the population". Intended for policy planning purposes, as of March 2021 census data is not tabulated on the level of these Areas, but instead at the municipality or state level.

Mexico

Metropolitan areas are known as zonas metropolitanas in Mexico. The National Population Council (CONAPO) defines them as:
 a set of two or more municipalities where a city with a population of at least 100,000 is located, and whose urban area, functions and activities exceed the limits of the municipality.
 municipalities with a city of more than 500,000 inhabitants, or a city of more than 200,000 inhabitants located in the northern and southern border areas and in the coastal zone. 
 municipalities where state capitals are located, if they are not already included in a metropolitan zone.
As of 2018, there are 74 zonas metropolitanas in Mexico. 75.1 million people, 62.8% of the country population, live within a metropolitan area.

United States

As of February 28, 2013, the United States Office of Management and Budget (OMB) defined 1,098 statistical areas for the metropolitan areas of the United States and Puerto Rico. These 1,098 statistical areas comprise 929 Core-Based Statistical Areas (CBSAs) and 169 Combined Statistical Areas (CSAs). The 929 Core-Based Statistical Areas are divided into 388 Metropolitan Statistical Areas (MSAs – 381 for the U.S. and seven for Puerto Rico) and 541 Micropolitan Statistical Areas (μSAs – 536 for the U.S. and five for Puerto Rico). The 169 Combined Statistical Areas (166 for the U.S. and three for Puerto Rico) each comprise two or more adjacent Core Based Statistical Areas.

The Office of Management and Budget defines a Metropolitan Statistical Area as one or more adjacent counties or county equivalents that have at least one urban area of at least 50,000 population, plus adjacent territory that has a high degree of economic and social integration with the core as measured by commuting ties. The OMB then defines a Combined Statistical Area as consisting of various combinations of adjacent metropolitan and micropolitan statistical areas with economic ties measured by commuting patterns. The Office of Management and Budget further defines a core-based statistical area (CBSA) to be a geographical area that consists of one or more counties (or equivalents) anchored by an urban center of at least 10,000 people plus adjacent counties that are socioeconomically tied to the urban center by commuting.

Asia and the Pacific

Australia

The Australian Bureau of Statistics uses Greater Capital City Statistical Areas (GCCSAs), which are geographical areas designed to represent the functional extent of each of the eight state and territory capital cities. They were designed to reflect labor markets, using the 2011 Census "travel to work" data. Labor markets are sometimes used as proxy measures of the functional extent of a city as it contains the majority of the commuting population. GCCSAs replaced "Statistical Divisions" used until 2011.

Other metropolitan areas in Australia include cross border cities or continuous built-up areas between two or more cities that are connected by an extensive public transport network that allows for commuting for work or services. The following are such conurbations-
Albury-Wodonga
Canberra-Queanbeyan
Newcastle-Sydney-Wollongong
Perth Metropolitan Region-City of Mandurah-Pinjarra
South East Queensland
Melbourne-Geelong

Bangladesh
In Bangladesh, the large population centers which have significant Financial, political and administrative Importance are considered to be as Metropolitan cities, which are governed by City Corporations. In total, there are 12 City Corporations in Bangladesh. 4 of them (Dhaka North City Corporation, Dhaka South City Corporation, Narayanganj City Corporation, Gazipur City Corporation) are part of Greater Dhaka Conurbation.

China
In Chinese, there used to be no clear distinction between megalopolis (lit. city cluster) and metropolitan area until National Development and Reform Commission issued Guidelines on the Cultivation and Development of Modern Metropolitan Areas on Feb 19, 2019, in which a metropolitan area was defined as "an urbanized spatial form in a megalopolis dominated by (a) supercity(-ies) or megacity(-ies), or a large metropolis playing a leading part, and within the basic range of 1-hour commute area."

India

In India, a metropolitan city is defined as one with a population more than 4 million.

Indonesia

In Indonesia, the government of Indonesia defines a metropolitan area as an urban agglomeration where its spatial planning is prioritised due to its highly important influence on the country. Jakarta, Surabaya, Bandung, Semarang, Medan, Makassar, Palembang are important metropolitan area in the country. Currently, there are 10 metropolitan cities in Indonesia that have been recognized by the government.

Pakistan

Pakistan has nine metropolitan areas with populations greater than a million. Seven of these are entirely in Punjab including Lahore, Faisalabad, Gujranwala, Multan, Bahawalpur, Sargodha, and Sialkot; one (Islamabad-Rawalpindi is split between Punjab and the Islamabad Capital Territory; two are located in Sindh, including Karachi, the largest metropolitan area in the country, and Hyderabad; one in Khyber Pakhtunkhwa: Peshawar; and the final in Balochistan: Quetta.

Philippines

The Philippines currently has three metropolitan areas defined by the National Economic and Development Authority (NEDA). These metropolitan areas are separated into three main geographical areas; Metro Manila (which is located in Luzon), Metro Cebu (which is located in Visayas), and Metro Davao (which is located in Mindanao). The official definition of each area does not necessarily follow the actual extent of continuous urbanization. For example, the built-up area of Metro Manila has long spilled out of its officially defined borders into the adjacent provinces of Bulacan, Rizal, Laguna, and Cavite. The number of metropolitan areas in the Philippines was reduced from 13 in 2007 to the current three based from the 2017–2022 Philippine Development Plan by NEDA. The other 10 metropolitan areas were Metro Angeles, Metro Bacolod, Metro Baguio, Metro Batangas, Metro Cagayan de Oro, Metro Dagupan, Metro Iloilo–Guimaras, Metro Butuan, Metro Naga, and Metro Olongapo.

Europe
The European Union's statistical agency, Eurostat, has created a concept named larger urban zone (LUZ). The LUZ represents an attempt at a harmonised definition of the metropolitan area, and the goal was to have an area from which a significant share of the residents commute into the city, a concept known as the "functional urban region".

France
The official translation of this statistical area in English (as used by INSEE) is "functional area". The AAV follows the same definition as the Functional Urban Area (FUA) used by Eurostat and the OECD, and the AAVs are thus strictly comparable to the FUAs.

The AAV replaced in 2020 the metropolitan statistical area called aire urbaine (AU). The AU, which was defined differently than the AAV, has now been discarded by INSEE and replaced with the AAV in order to facilitate international comparisons.

Germany

In German definition, metropolitan areas are eleven most densely populated areas in the Federal Republic of Germany. They comprise the major German cities and their surrounding catchment areas and form the political, commercial and cultural centers of the country.

For urban centers outside metropolitan areas, that generate a similar attraction at smaller scale for their region, the concept of the Regiopolis and respectively regiopolitan area or region was introduced by German professors in 2006.

Italy
In 2001, Italy transformed 14 provinces of some of the country's largest cities into Metropolitan Cities. Therefore, the territory of the Metropolitan City corresponds to that of a normal Italian province.

Sweden

Sweden defines a metropolitan area as a group of municipalities, based on statistics of commuting between central municipalities and surrounding municipalities and taking into account existing planning cooperation in the country's three geographic regions. They were defined around 1965. In 2005, a number of further municipalities were added to the defined areas.

Turkey
The word metropolitan describes the central municipality governing local services in a province with more than 750.000 residents in Turkey, like Istanbul and its metropolitan municipality, the Istanbul Metropolitan Municipality. There are 30 officially defined "metropolitan municipalities" in Turkey. This classification, however, is only used for administrative purposes, and sometimes contradicts the colloquial use of the term "metro area". As an example, Gebze, a district in Kocaeli province and thus in the juristiction of the Kocaeli Metropolitan Municipality, is arguably within the metro area of Istanbul with many of its residents commuting to Istanbul for work and the Marmaray, a commuter rail line, extending into the district. The district however, as previosuly mentioned, is not a part of Istanbul's provincial limits, and thus not subject to the jurisdiction of its metropolitan municipality. The word metropolitan (municipality) is generally only used as an administrative distinction in Turkey.

United Kingdom
The United Kingdom government's Office for National Statistics defines "travel to work areas" as areas where "at least 75% of an area's resident workforce work in the area and at least 75% of the people who work in the area also live in the area".

The European Union's ESPON group has compiled a separate list of metropolitan areas which covers the UK.

See also

Notes

References

External links
  (page 1 illustrates metropolitan area versus city proper and urban agglomeration)
 Metropolis.org, An organization of world metropolises
 Urban Employment Areas in Japan (Metropolitan Employment Areas in Japan)
 Turismo.fvg.it (Metropolis read by maps in Friuli Venezia Giulia – Northeast of Italy – EU)
 Geopolis : research group, university of Paris-Diderot, France — Urbanization of the world

 
Cities
Capitals
Urban geography